Tong Zhonggui (born January 23, 1963), known by the pen name of Su Tong  is a Chinese writer.  He was born in Suzhou and lives in Nanjing.

He entered the Department of Chinese at Beijing Normal University in 1980, and started to publish novels in 1983. He is now vice president of the Jiangsu Writers Association. Known for his controversial writing style, Su is one of the most acclaimed novelists in China.

Work 
Su has written seven full-length novels and over 200 short stories, some of which have been translated into English, German, Italian and French.

He is best known in the West for his novella Raise the Red Lantern (originally titled Wives and Concubines), published in 1990. The book was adapted into the film, Raise the Red Lantern by director Zhang Yimou. The book has since been published under the name given to the film in the English version and in some other versions. His other works available in English translation are Rice, My Life as Emperor, Petulia's Rouge Tin (Hongfen in Chinese), Binu and the Great Wall (tr. Howard Goldblatt), Madwoman on the Bridge and Other Stories,  Tattoo: Three Novellas and The Boat to Redemption, also translated by Goldblatt.

His novel Petulia's Rouge Tin, about two Shanghai prostitutes at the time of Liberation in 1949, has been adapted to two films: Li Shaohong's Blush (Hongfen, 1994) and Huang Shuqin's Rouged Beauties (Hongfen Jiaren, 1995).

In 2009, he was awarded the Man Asian Literary Prize for his work The Boat to Redemption, the second Chinese writer to win the prize.

In 2011, Su Tong was nominated to win the Man Booker International Prize. In 2015, he was a co-winner of the Mao Dun Literature Prize for Yellowbird Story.

Selected works in translation
 Open-Air Cinema: Reminiscences and Micro-Essays from the Author of Raise the Red Lantern. Translators Haiwang Yuan, James Trapp, Nicky Harman, Olivia Milburn. Horsham: Sinoist Books. October 2021. 
 Shadow of the Hunter. Translator James Trapp. London: ACA Publishing. May 2020. 
 
 
  
  
  
 
 
 
 Includes Raise the Red Lantern, Nineteen Thirty-four Escapes, and Opium Family. The second novella, told in the first person, is about an impoverished peasant family. The third story is about an opium poppy-growing family that experiences hardship; this work is told in both the first and third person perspectives.
 In the latter two novellas, Duke had stated "that wherever the English seems strange it is because the Chinese was also purposefully so". Gary Krist of The New York Times felt the translations had a "rambling nature" that became "merely awkward, unrevealing and occasionally tedious." Because of Duke's statement, Krist was unsure whether the awkwardness came from Su Tong or from Duke. Publishers Weekly stated that a "hand-me-down quality of oral history" where the reader is unsure of the truth is reflected in Nineteen Thirty-four Escapes. Publishers Weekly praised how the third novella shifts perspectives and wrote that Opium Family is "the most structurally and thematically complex of the novellas."

References

1963 births
Living people
Beijing Normal University alumni
Writers from Suzhou
International Writing Program alumni
Mao Dun Literature Prize laureates
Chinese male novelists
20th-century Chinese short story writers
Chinese male short story writers
20th-century Chinese male writers
People's Republic of China short story writers
Short story writers from Jiangsu